Holy Cross Cathedral is a Greek Catholic cathedral of Eparchy of Mukachevo in Uzhhorod, Ukraine. It is dedicated to the Exaltation of the Holy Cross.

The Baroque church was built in 1646 at the behest of the Jesuits from funds donated by the Drugeth noble family. It sustained some damage during Rákóczi's War of Independence. After the Society of Jesus was suppressed in 1773, Empress Maria Theresa allowed the Greek Catholics to take possession of the building. It was renovated to László Fabri's Neoclassical designs in 1848.

During the Soviet period (1945–1991) the building was transferred to the Russian Orthodox Church. On October 10, 1991, after the legalization and restoration of the Greek Catholic Church, the cathedral was returned to the Greek Catholic Eparchy of Mukachevo. On June 28, 2003, the relics of Blessed Theodore Romzha were translated to the cathedral. 

According to the official website of the Eparchy of Mukachevo, it still does not have its episcopal residence.

See also 
 Uzhhorod Orthodox Cathedral

References

External links 
 
 Holy Cross Greek Catholic Cathedral, Uzhhorod Ukraine 

Uzhhorod
Buildings and structures in Uzhhorod
Religious buildings and structures completed in 1646
1646 establishments in the Habsburg monarchy
17th-century establishments in Hungary
Tourist attractions in Zakarpattia Oblast
Uzhorod
Neoclassical church buildings in Ukraine